HNoMS Tordenskjold, known locally as Panserskipet Tordenskjold, was a Norwegian coastal defence ship. She, her sister ship, and the slightly newer  were built as a part of the general rearmament in the time leading up to the events in 1905. Tordenskjold remained an important vessel in the Royal Norwegian Navy until she was considered unfit for war in the mid-1930s.

Description

Built at Elswick and nearly identical to her sister ship , Tordenskjold was named after Peter Wessel Tordenskjold, an eminent Norwegian naval hero in the service of the Kingdom of Denmark-Norway. Built as a typical pre-dreadnought battleship on a small scale, she carried guns of a wide range of calibers: two  guns in barbettes, six , six , and six smaller quick-firing guns.

Service history and fate
A vital part of the Royal Norwegian Navy, Tordenskjold performed ordinary duties until 1918, when she was turned into a cadet ship. She performed well in this role, carrying out eighteen training cruises until considered "unfit for war" in the mid-1930s. After the German invasion of Norway, she was seized by the Germans and rebuilt as a floating flak battery with 10.5 cm AA guns and renamed Nymphe. In May, 1945 she was damaged by RAF aircraft at Svolvaer and beached. She was refloated later in the year. After the war Tordenskjold was used briefly as a floating barracks before she was sold for scrapping in 1948.

Today
Today the name KNM Tordenskjold is used on the Norwegian Naval Training Establishment (NORNAVTRAINEST) at Haakonsvern, Bergen.

Footnotes

Tordenskjold-class coastal defence ships
Ships built on the River Tyne
1897 ships
World War II coastal defence ships of Norway
Naval ships of Norway captured by Germany during World War II
Auxiliary ships of the Kriegsmarine
World War II coastal defense ships of Germany
Maritime incidents in May 1945